Bruce Cliff Caldwell (17 October 1908 – c. 1975) was a rugby union player who represented Australia.

Caldwell, a centre, was born in Randwick, New South Wales and claimed 1 international rugby cap for Australia.

References

Australian rugby union players
Australia international rugby union players
1908 births
1975 deaths
Rugby union players from Sydney
Rugby union centres